William Markham may refer to:

 William Markham (bishop) (1710–1807), English scholar and religious figure
 William Markham (governor) (1635–1704), first acting governor of colonial Pennsylvania
 William Markham (mayor) (1811–1890), Atlanta businessman and mayor
William Markham (MP) (by 1533–1571), MP for Nottingham (UK Parliament constituency)
 William H. Markham (1888–1958), Wisconsin politician
 William Orlando Markham (1818–1891), English physician and pioneer of cardiology